Sandbanks is a national park in Far North Queensland, Australia, 1,829 km northwest of Brisbane.

See also

 Protected areas of Queensland

References 

National parks of Far North Queensland
Protected areas established in 1989
1989 establishments in Australia